Nearer the Gods is a 2018 Australian comedy play by David Williamson about Isaac Newton.

In October 2018 the play opened the newly refurbished Bille Brown Theatre for the Queensland Theatre Company.

Williamson said he was inspired to write the play after reading about Newton's relationship with Edmund Halley, wife Mary and Robert Hooke. The playwright said, "This story wasn’t just about a great scientific breakthrough, it was about an inescapable human dilemma. While the advanced parts of our brain are capable of rational thought at the highest level, our deep and powerful reptilian brainstem urges us to attain power and status at all costs. To belittle, crush and vanquish our rivals."

Plot
Sir Isaac Newton battles with the Royal Society to prove his universal theory of gravity.

References

External links
Nearer the Gods at Ausstage
Review of play at Limelight
Review of play at Daily Review
Review ofplay at Faces of Brisbane
Review of play at The Courier-Mail
Review of play at the Blurb

Plays by David Williamson
2018 plays
Comedy plays